In precision agriculture, variable rate application (VRA) refers to the application of a material, such that the rate of application is  based on the precise location, or qualities of the area that the material is being applied to. This is different from uniform application, and can be used to save money (using less product), and lessen the environmental impact. 

Variable rate application can be either map based or sensor based.
 Map based VRA is pre-planned, and applications are based on VRA prescription maps that an agronomist or advisor prepares based on data sources. Prescription maps can be created using electromagnetic induction, which is considered to be cost-effective, and non-destructive.
 Sensor based VRA is calculated realtime, based on sensors that are local to the variable rate applicator.

Applications of VRA
In precision agriculture, VRA is known to be used in the following areas.

Seeding 
Planters and drills can be made into VRA sensors, by attaching a motor or gear box. With this, you can vary the rate of the seeds. The seeding rates can also be connected to match the application of agrochemicals.

Weed control 
For variable rate weed control you need both a task computer and a system to physically change the flow rate of the agrochemicals.

Fertilizer 
Crops do not always require a uniform application, as some areas will have different nutrient requirements due to their location (soil properties, sunlight). Variable rate fertilizer spreaders can be used to increase or decrease fertilizer application rate, using a global positioning system (GPS). They can also use "on-the-go" sensors, or a combination of the two.

References

Agricultural soil science
Precision agriculture